"Nwa Baby" (Ashawo Remix) is a song by Nigerian singer Flavour N'abania. It was released as the lead single from his second studio album, Uplifted (2010). The song originally appeared on his debut studio album N'abania (2005). It describes girls who transform themselves from being reserved to being outgoing. On May 18, 2013, Flavour performed "Nwa Baby" (Ashawo Remix) at People's Park in Durban, South Africa, alongside D'banj, 2Face Idibia, Fally Ipupa, and Snoop Dogg.

Background and release 
"Nwa Baby" (Ashawo Remix) was written by Flavour N'abania and released on June 22, 2011. It is a remake of Cardinal Rex's 1960 hit "Sawale".

Music video and accolades
The music video for "Nwa Baby" (Ashawo Remix) was shot in South Africa by Godfather Production. It was nominated for Most Gifted Afro-Pop Video and Most Gifted African West Video at the 2011 Channel O Music Video Awards. It was also nominated for Best High Life Video at the 2011 Nigeria Entertainment Awards.

Track listing
 Digital single

References

2011 singles
Flavour N'abania songs
2011 songs